On Sunday 29 September 1885, 37-year-old English Police Sergeant Robert Kidd was killed near Wigan northwestern station, (then Lancashire), England while investing railway thefts. Kidd and a fellow officer were responding to a number of reports of thefts at the goods yard adjacent to the station. He was fatally injured by a knife. In Dec 1895, two men, Elijah Winstanley and William Kearsley, were found guilty of manslaughter and received the death sentence. One was later were commuted to penal servitude for life and one was hanged.

See also
 List of British police officers killed in the line of duty

References

1853 births
1895 deaths
1895 in England
1890s trials
1895 crimes in the United Kingdom
British police officers killed in the line of duty
Deaths by person in England
Manslaughter in the United Kingdom
Murder trials
Wigan